Arshin Mal Alan may refer to:
Arshin Mal Alan (operetta) 
a 1917 film more commonly known in English as The Cloth Peddler
a 1945 film more commonly known in English as The Cloth Peddler
Arshin Mal Alan (1965 film)